Cronk ny Arrey Laa is a hill in the south west of the Isle of Man. It may be confused with a hill of a similar name in the parish of Jurby, further north along the west coast of the island.

At  it is the second highest hill in this part of the island, after the South Barrule, 2 miles (3 km) to the east. It is in the parish of Rushen, although the boundary with the parish of Patrick is only about 200 metres to the north of its summit.

Name 

Its name means Hill of the Day Watch due to it having been used as a look out post for invaders during the time of the Viking invasions.

The hill is also known locally as Cronk ny Irree-Laa, meaning hill of the rising day or dawn. It was said that when the sun broke over this hill, it was a sign to the herring-fishers to shoot their nets.

Features 
Its steep western slope rises directly out of the sea in a cliff.

The area surrounding it has also been described by Trail Magazine as "some of the wildest terrain on any British coast path". and by Manx National Heritage as "amongst the most spectacular to be seen anywhere in the British Isles."

However, the summit is only about 500 metres from the main road between Port Erin/Port St Mary and Peel, and may be climbed as part of an easy day walk between those places. The summit is on the long distance path, the Raad ny Foillan.

The summit is one of the few places anywhere with views of what Manx people call "the six kingdoms" (Mann, England, Scotland, Ireland, Wales, and Heaven), with some adding a seventh "kingdom", Neptune (the sea). The boggy slopes are home to unusual plant species such as the carnivorous sundew.

Pilgrimage site 
This is an ancient place of pilgrimage. Two particular sites on the slopes of Cronk ny Arrey Laa were visited: the "Chibbyr ny Vashtey" (well of baptism) and the Manx Keil (chapel) at Lag ny Keeilley on the steep western face.

References

External links 
 Cronk ny Arrey Laa with sea mist
 Cronk ny Arrey Laa, sea cliffs

Mountains and hills of the Isle of Man